The 1979 CECAFA Cup was the 7th edition of annual CECAFA Cup, an international football competition consisting of the national teams of member nations of the Council for East and Central Africa Football Associations (CECAFA). The tournament was held in Kenya from November 3 to November 17 and saw seven teams competing in the competition. It was held in Kenya, and was won by Malawi.

Group A

Group B

It is unclear why Zanzibar was placed the second over Sudan; probably by drawing lot

Semifinals

Third place match

Final

References
Rsssf info

CECAFA Cup
International association football competitions hosted by Kenya
CECAFA